The Norwegian Cancer Society is a non-profitmaking organisation in Norway.

History 
Its purpose is to help patients with cancer, increase awareness of cancer and to fund cancer research. The society funds the annual King Olav V's Prize for Cancer Research.

Organizational structure 
The Secretary general is Anne Lise Ryel, and the board of directors consists of Gunn-Elin Aasprong Bjørneboe (chair), Carl Otto Løvenskiold (deputy chair), Tone Nordøy, Wenche Frogn Sellæg, Jostein Christian Dalland, Tord Dale, Lars A. Akslen,  Grete Wennes, Anine Kierulf and Else Støring. The organizational headquarters are in Kongens gate 6 in Oslo.

References

External links
Official site

Organizations established in 1938
Organisations based in Oslo
Medical and health organisations based in Norway
Cancer organizations
Cancer awareness